Santosh Madhavan (born 7 June 1960) is an Indian Godman under the name of Amritha Chaithanya. Santosh Madhavan has been wanted by Interpol since 2004 for fraud committed in United Arab Emirates. A Dubai-based Indian woman, Serafin Edwin, accused him of cheating her of 400,000 dirhams in 2002. He founded Shantitheeram trust under his and his parents' name. He was arrested near Cochin on May 18, 2008 for fraud.

He was found guilty of pedophilia and producing pornography videos of him molesting underage girls. While in police custody, he complained of chest pain and was admitted to hospital. He was sentenced for 16 years in prison for molesting two underage girls on May 20, 2009.

References

Emirati people of Malayali descent
Indian people convicted of rape
1960 births
Living people
Hindu religious leaders convicted of crimes